Thomas Oden Lambdin (October 31, 1927 – May 8, 2020) was a leading scholar of the Semitic and Egyptian languages. He received his Ph.D. in 1952 from the Johns Hopkins University Department of Near Eastern Studies, where his advisor was William Foxwell Albright; his dissertation was on "Egyptian Loanwords and Transcriptions in the Ancient Semitic Languages." He was appointed as an associate professor of Semitic Languages at Harvard University in 1964. He retired from Harvard in 1983 and served as Professor Emeritus until his death. He was admired not only for his research and his "tireless teaching", but for the quality of his introductory textbooks on Biblical Hebrew, Coptic, Ge'ez and Gothic language. His Festschrift, Working with No Data: Semitic and Egyptian Studies Presented to Thomas O. Lambdin (ed. David M. Golomb and Susan T. Hollis; Winona Lake: Eisenbrauns, 1987) includes a full bibliography of his publications, as well as chapters by John Huehnergard and Richard J. Clifford about their experiences as his students

Works

References

Linguists from the United States
Harvard University faculty
2020 deaths
1927 births